Diraphora is an extinct genus of brachiopod that lived in the Cambrian. Its remains have been found in Australia and North America. 664 specimens of Diraphora are known from the Greater Phyllopod bed, where they comprise 1.26% of the community.

References 

Diraphora at the Field Museum's Evolving Planet

External links

Diraphora in the Paleobiology Database

Burgess Shale fossils
Cambrian brachiopods
Cambrian brachiopods of Oceania
Cambrian brachiopods of North America
Cambrian genus extinctions